Hasse Kristian Borg (born 4 August 1953) is a Swedish former football defender who represented his country at the 1978 FIFA World Cup. He played for Örebro SK, Eintracht Braunschweig and Malmö FF. Borg was director of sports for Malmö FF between 1999 and 2009. He is now working for the club as a consultant.

References

External links

1953 births
Swedish footballers
Sweden international footballers
Malmö FF players
Örebro SK players
Eintracht Braunschweig players
Allsvenskan players
Bundesliga players
2. Bundesliga players
Expatriate footballers in West Germany
Living people
1978 FIFA World Cup players
BK Forward players
Association football defenders
Sportspeople from Örebro
Swedish expatriate sportspeople in West Germany